Neolithic Italy refer to the period that spanned from circa 6000 BCE, when neolithic influences from the east reached the Italian peninsula and the surrounding island bringing the so-called Neolithic revolution, to circa 3500-3000 BCE, when metallurgy began to spread.

Early Neolithic

The neolithization of Italy

In the Western Mediterranean region the first wave of neolithization came by sea, with the spread of the Cardium pottery (or Impressed Ware), decorated with impressions mainly obtained through the shell of the genus Cardium (hence the nickname cardial ceramic), on all the coasts of Western Mediterranean, from Liguria, to southern France and Spain. Central Europe was instead hit by another, related but different, wave that went up the Danube, bringing the Linear Pottery (Linienbandkeramik). The meeting between the farmers and the European Mesolithic communities produced many regional variations of the two main strands of Impressed pottery and Linear Pottery.

In Southern Italy the impressed pottery Neolithic culture spread, between the second half of the sixth millennium BC and the beginning of V, especially in the Tavoliere delle Puglie, Irpinia and Basilicata, from where it spread to the north and the interior and the Tyrrhenian coast. In Sicily there was more continuity with the local Mesolithic communities. The island of Lipari was colonized at the beginning of the fifth millennium BC by people coming from Sicily for the exploitation of its deposits of obsidian.

In Central Italy the presence of the Apennines caused the formation of different regional horizons on the Tyrrhenian side and on the Adriatic one, with different cultural facies that succeeded each other with some overlaps. In Sardinia, the exploitation of the obsidian deposits of the Monte Arci led to the early development of the Neolithic cultures, introduced with the culture of the impressed pottery in the early sixth millennium BC.

In Northern Italy a variant of the Impressed Ware, established himself on the Ligurian coast in the first half of the sixth millennium BC. While in the process of neolithization of Northwest Italy occurs through influences of the Ligurian Impressed Ware, in Romagna the facies of the Adriatic Impressed Ceramic spread around the middle of the fifth millennium BC thanks to the contribution of the connected groups of the Abruzzo-Marche Impressed Ware. At the end of the millennium the area of the Po Valley was subdivided by a mosaic of cultures united by the ceramic decoration. At the beginning of the fifth millennium BC the former cultural mosaic was replaced by the culture of the square mouthed vases, widespread from Liguria to Veneto.

Middle Neolithic

Southern Italy

Sicily

Central Italy

Sardinia

Northern Italy

Late Neolithic

Southern Italy

Sicily

Central Italy

Sardinia

Northern Italy

Economy

From the middle of the sixth millennium BC the Neolithic groups in Italy began a wider exploitation of local resources: they developed the domestication of wild species, such as cattle and pigs, with a "mixed" economy between agriculture (attested by the presence of mills, grinders and sickles) and livestock in predominantly permanent settlements. However hunting, fishing and shellfishing were still important activities.

Obsidian, valuable raw material for the making of tools, played a major role in the trades of the neolithic communities; the most important deposits were located in Sardinia (Monte Arci), at Lipari, Pantelleria and Palmarola. From there it was exported in the Italian peninsula but also in Southern France and in North Africa.

Religion
The religiosity of the Italian Neolithic groups was centered on the worship of the Mother Goddess of which have been recovered numerous statuettes throughout the entire territory.

Later, in the last phase of the Neolithic period, in Sardinia and Val d'Aosta appeared new religious ideologies related to the introduction of Megalithism from the West.

See also
 Neolithic Europe 
 Pre-Nuragic Sardinia
 Prehistoric Italy

Notes

Bibliography 
 AA.VV., Guida della Preistoria italiana, Sansoni, Firenze 1975
 Cocchi Genick D., Manuale di Preistoria, Neolitico, volume II, Octavo, Firenze 1994
 Guidi  A. - Piperno M. (a cura di), Italia preistorica, Laterza, Roma-Bari 1992

External links 
 Il neolitico in Italia